So Much Naked Tenderness (German: So viel nackte Zärtlichkeit) is a 1968 West German crime drama film directed by Günter Hendel and starring Erika Remberg, Erich Fritze and Lutz Hochstraate.

Cast
 Erika Remberg as Kitty 
 Erich Fritze as Peter Kremer 
 Lutz Hochstraate as Jochen 
 Doris Arden as Eva 
 Klaus Krüger
 Günter Hendel as Priest 
 Johannes Buzalski as Jimmy

References

Bibliography
Cowie, Peter. World Filmography, 1968. Tantivy Press, 1977.

External links

1968 films
1960s erotic drama films
1968 crime drama films
German crime drama films
West German films
1960s German-language films
Films directed by Günter Hendel
German erotic drama films
1960s German films